The Latin American Literary Review/Press, affiliated with the Department of Comparative Literature in Cornell University,  Ithaca, New York, is a non-profit organization.  The founding editor-in-chief was Yvette E. Miller.; she has been succeeded by Debra A. Castillo.

Miller developed two entities: the Latin American Literary Review, a literary magazine, and the Latin American Literary Review Press, which published English translations of Latin American literature.

The Latin American Literary Review was established in 1972 and is published biannually.  As of 2017 it has moved to an online platform with the Latin American Research Commons and Ubiquity Press. It contains feature essays, creative work, new translations of important texts, and reviews of recent literary works from Latin America. It publishes articles in English, Spanish, and Portuguese.

The Latin American Literary Review Press was founded in 1980 and has published creative writing and literary criticism that has been translated into English. The press was created with the principal objective of familiarizing readers outside the field with Latin American literature. Since Miller's death, the Press has been inactive.

Notable publications
Legends of Guatemala - by Miguel Ángel Asturias
Bubbeh - by Sabina Berman
My Heart Flooded with Water - selected poems by Alfonsina Storni
Bazaar of the Idiots - by Gustavo Álvarez Gardeazábal
Yo-Yo Boing! - by Giannina Braschi; introduction by Doris Sommer and Alexandra Vega Merino.
Memories of Underdevelopment - by Edmundo Desnoes
Nazarín - by Benito Pérez Galdós
Patient - by Ana María Shua
Breakthrough - by Mercedes Valdivieso

See also

Bilingual Review Press
The Bilingual Review
Chiricú
Hispanic and Latino Americans
 Aztlán: A Journal of Chicano Studies
 MELUS (Society for the Study of the Multi-Ethnic Literature)
 Review: Literature and Arts of the Americas

References

External links
 

Book publishing companies based in Pennsylvania
Mass media in Pittsburgh
Publishing companies established in 1972
Hispanic and Latino American literature
Linguistics journals
Literary magazines published in the United States
Latin American literature
Literary publishing companies